Kick & Slide is an original Japanese anime television series produced by animation studio CRAFTER. It aired in Japan on TV Tokyo through its Oha Suta children's variety program on July 7, 2021.

This is the LDH's first kids entertainment project "KIDS B HAPPY" which is a deformed character of the third generation J Soul Brothers.

Plot
Kick & Slide is a slapstick story where the characters solve the difficult and rare cases in the pop vibrant city calls "Nakame Town" with their own dance and music technics.

Characters

Media

Anime
This series is being produced by CRAFTER. Planning by LDH Japan and KIDS B HAPPY Project. Directing, series composition and screenplay by Takafumi Otsuka, character design by Naomi Iwata, music composed by PKCZ and Chaki Zulu, sound directed by Kiyoshi Arakawa and executive producer is EXILE TRIBE. This anime's image song is "KICK&SLIDE” by the third generation J SOUL BROTHERS.

References

External links
Official website 

TV Tokyo original programming
Animated television series about animals
Anime with original screenplays